Beijing Wuzi University is a higher education institution based in the capital of China, Beijing.

As of 2021, Beijing Wuzi University ranked 5th in Beijing and 22nd nationwide among universities specialized in finance, business, and economics in the recent edition of the recognized Best Chinese Universities Ranking.

History 
The university was the Materials institute of the Beijing Economics College which was founded in 1963. In 1980, the Beijing Materials University was created. It was initially administered by the Bureau of National Material. This was then transferred to the Ministry of Material and then Ministry of Internal Trade.

Since October 1998, the university came under the administration of the Beijing Municipal Government.

Administration

Colleges and Departments 
Beijing Materials University comprises the following departments:

 Department of Economics 
 Department of Accounting
 Department of Business Management
 Department of Management Science and Engineering 
 Department of Labor Personnel Management 
 Department of Foreign Languages 
 Department of Social Science 
 Department of Basic Course 
 Department of Physical Education 
 Department of Postgraduate
Circulation Economics Graduate School
Higher-learning Education Graduate School
Logistics Research Center 
China Circulation Economy Magazine Organization.

References

External links 
 

Universities and colleges in Beijing
Educational institutions established in 1980
1980 establishments in China